Model Behaviour or Model Behavior may refer to:

 "Model Behaviour", short story in the collection The Longest Night
 Model Behaviour (film), a 1982 American romantic-comedy film
 Model Behavior, a 2000 television movie starring Maggie Lawson, Justin Timberlake, and Kathie Lee Gifford
 Model Behaviour (TV series), UK Channel 4 series, 2001–2002

See also 
 Behavior model
 Behavior modeling